Route nationale 42 (RN 42) is a secondary highway in Madagascar, running from Fianarantsoa to Ambatomainty. It crosses the region of Haute Matsiatra.

Selected locations on route
(east to north-west)
Fianarantsoa  - (intersection with RN 7 )
Isorana
Ikalamavony  - 94 km
crossing Matsiatra river
Ambatomainty - 134 km

See also
List of roads in Madagascar
Transport in Madagascar

References

Roads in Haute Matsiatra
Roads in Madagascar